Fiber to the premises in the United States are primarily covered by Google Fiber, Verizon, and Lightower.

By company

Open-access networks

Several carriers, municipalities, and planned communities across America are deploying their own fiber networks. Open Access Networks differ from incumbent models by being horizontally integrated, which allows for multiple service providers to operate on one network and promotes market competition. Among them is the City of Burlington, Vermont "Burlington Telecom" and Lafayette, Louisiana.

The city of San Francisco, California has released a feasibility study for government and public broadband via fiber optics.  This was the result of San Francisco supervisors' vote to adopt a resolution to encourage certain city departments to consider installing FTTP for use primarily in city operations. This then evolved into the fiber feasibility study which also includes "services to businesses and residents." The study estimated build-out costs of $564 million. It has been released as a draft in order for members of the public to provide comments and input.

Service providers using Active FTTP technologies include YRT2 Inc.; PAXIO Inc.; SureWest; iProvo; Grant County, Washington; UTOPIA; CDE Lighband, Clarksville, TN and Broadweave Networks.  Service providers using passive optical networks include Verizon (FiOS), AT&T (U-verse), and several greenfield development networks.

There is also another FTTH provider UTOPIA, based in Salt Lake County, Utah, which currently services 11 cities. This municipal fiber network is an open network to many local ISPs, including Xmission, Sumo, and Veracity, and other service providers who have bought onto the network. The speeds of the network range around 100 Mbit/s to 1 Gbit/s for residential use and 20 Mbit/s to 10 Gbit/s for business use.

Hargray Communications—Hilton Head Island, SC—Savannah, GA to Beaufort, SC—offers metro e - symmetrical data (up to 1g over 1g) 50x5

EPB Fiber Optics provides a GPON network that offers fiber to the premise to Chattanooga, TN and some neighboring cities. They offer 1Gig internet service, which is the fastest speed available in the nation, as well as TV and phone service.

In 2008, Greenlight was introduced in Wilson, North Carolina, which created the system at a cost of $28 million. The reason was the lack of interest in fiber optic from private companies.

With job losses, a major problem in Salisbury, North Carolina, the concept of municipal broadband was studied beginning in 2005. City council members looked at Wilson's system as an example of what Salisbury could do to help the economy. Also, Internet access in the city was slow.

Municipal power provider, CDE Lightband in Clarksville, TN launched their 1 Gig service in 2013 via an active FTTP plant.  They also offer digital television and phone services.

State laws and litigation
Fibrant in Salisbury, North Carolina was one of 60 municipal networks located across the country. The city borrowed $30 million to install the service, which offered faster Internet speeds at a lower price than competitors. The North Carolina General Assembly was considering legislation to stop such networks, which private companies opposed as the municipal utilities did not have to pay taxes and did not have the ability to subsidize.

On February 26, 2015, the FCC voted on a petition by Chattanooga, Tennessee and Wilson, North Carolina asking for "federal preemption of state laws". States opposed this effort to increase competition. South Carolina had a law which prevented governments from benefiting in ways private sector services could not. A service provided by Monticello, Minnesota had failed and bondholders sued, leading to concerns about who would pay if similar situations occurred as a result of the FCC action. After the FCC vote, U.S. Sen. Thom Tillis of North Carolina and Rep. Marsha Blackburn of Tennessee introduced bills to stop the action. On February 1, 2016, FCC Chairman Tom Wheeler recommended that the commission act on the petition. If the vote went in the cities' favor, the state laws would no longer be in effect and municipal systems could expand outside the cities.

After Tennessee and North Carolina appealed, on August 10, 2016, the Sixth Circuit Court of Appeals ruled that the Telecommunications Act of 1996 did not necessarily give the FCC the right to prevent states from prohibiting municipal broadband.

References

External links 
 List of Fiber Internet Providers in the US

Telecommunications in the United States